Terms and Conditions May Apply (2013) is a documentary film that addresses how corporations and the government utilize the information that users provide when agreeing to browse a website, install an application, or purchase goods online. In the film, director/narrator Cullen Hoback discusses the language employed in user-service agreements and how online service providers collect and use users' and customers' information.

The film criticizes companies such as Facebook, Google, and LinkedIn for having poorly worded and misguiding privacy policies/terms of service, which use user-unfriendly language in long documents and allows the companies to collect user information and legally provide it to third-parties. The film aims to warn people about the risks of clicking "I Agree" after scrolling through pages of uninviting text.

Mark Zuckerberg appears in the film.

Interviewees
In alphabetical order:

See also
Index of articles related to terms of service and privacy policies

References

External 
  at tacma.net
 

2013 films
2013 documentary films
Documentary films about the Internet
Documentary films about law
Variance Films films
Terms of service
2010s English-language films
English-language documentary films